Focus, Please! is a Czech comedy film directed by Martin Frič. It was released in 1956.

Cast
 Jan Pivec as Posahal
 Josef Kemr as Prehrsle
 Zdeňka Baldová as Tchyne
 Gustav Heverle as Reditel
 Vlasta Burian as Dusek - ucetní
 Vlastimil Brodský as Macek
 František Vnouček as Sefredaktor
 František Filipovský as Tajemník
 Miloš Nedbal as Reditel
 Lubomír Lipský as Vrchní ucetní
 Ladislav Pešek as Komentátor
 Zdeněk Řehoř as Mladý 
 Frantisek Hanus as Autor filmu
 Bozena Obrová as Klapka

References

External links
 

1956 films
1950s Czech-language films
1956 comedy films
Czechoslovak black-and-white films
Films directed by Martin Frič
Czechoslovak comedy films
Czech comedy films
1950s Czech films